Tu ridi (internationally released as You Laugh, Two Kidnappings and Kaos II) is a 1998 Italian drama film. It is the second film adaptation based on short stories by Luigi Pirandello after Kaos directed by Paolo and Vittorio Taviani.

For this film Taviani were awarded as best director at Mar del Plata Film Festival.

It represents the last film starred by Turi Ferro.

Cast

Felice (Tu Ridi) 
 Antonio Albanese: Felice Tespini
 Sabrina Ferilli: Nora
 Giuseppe Cederna: Tobia Rambaldi
 Elena Ghiaurov: Marika
 Luca Zingaretti: Gino Migliori

Two Kidnappings (Due sequestri) 
 Lello Arena: Rocco
 Turi Ferro: Ballarò

References

External links
 

1998 films
Films directed by Paolo and Vittorio Taviani
Films based on works by Luigi Pirandello
Italian drama films
Italian anthology films
Films scored by Nicola Piovani
1990s Italian-language films
1990s Italian films